Henry Fleetwood (born ca. 1565) was an English politician who sat in the House of Commons  at various times between 1589 and 1611.

Fleetwood was the youngest son of Thomas Fleetwood of The Vache, Buckinghamshire and his second wife. He was educated at Gray's Inn in 1580 and was called to the bar in 1586. In 1589, he was elected Member of Parliament for Aylesbury.

Fleetwood became a Reader of Staple Inn in 1597 and an ancient of Gray's Inn in 1598. In 1601 he was elected MP for Wycombe. He was re-elected MP for Wycombe in 1604. Fleetwood was Lent reader in 1608 but was also found guilty of corruption by his inn of court in the same year.

Fleetwood married  Elizabeth Fust, daughter of Edward Fust of London. He was the brother of George Fleetwood and William Fleetwood, MP for Middlesex.

References

1560s births
Year of death missing
English MPs 1589
Year of birth uncertain
Members of Gray's Inn
English MPs 1601
English MPs 1604–1611